The WNBL Grand Final is the championship series of the Women's National Basketball League.

Champions

Results by team

See also

 NBL Grand Final
 AFL Women's Grand Final
 NRL Women's Grand Final
 W-League Grand Final

References

External links

Grand
Grand finals
Recurring sporting events established in 1981
Women's sport-related lists